The intertrochanteric line (or spiral line of the femur ) is a line located on the anterior side of the proximal end of the femur.

Structure
The rough, variable ridge stretches between the lesser trochanter and the greater trochanter forming the base of the neck of the femur, roughly following the direction of the shaft of the femur.  The iliofemoral ligament — the largest ligament of the human body — attaches above the line which also strengthens the capsule of the hip joint.

The lower half, less prominent than the upper half, gives origin to the upper part of the Vastus medialis.

Just like the intertrochanteric crest on the posterior side of the femoral head, the intertrochanteric line marks the transition between the femoral neck and shaft.

The distal capsular attachment on the femur follows the shape of the irregular rim between the head and the neck.  As a consequence, the capsule of the hip joint attaches in the region of the intertrochanteric line on the anterior side, but a finger away from the intertrochanteric crest on the posterior side of the head.

The fibers of the ischiocapsular ligament attach both into the joint capsule and onto the intertrochanteric line.

Clinical significance

Intertrochantric fractures
This area of the femur being an important pillar for weight bearing through the skeletal system is subject to comparatively high levels of dynamic stress, pathological strain, physiological strain and trauma. This area is prone to fractures due to high velocity trauma in the young and trivial trauma in the elderly. The fractures in this line are called intertrochantric fractures and are classified as per the pattern of the fracture geometry.

After a fracture this area of bone is notorious for uniting in varying, and sometimes problematic angles. Therefore, it typically requires early surgical reduction and fixation with early mobilization and weight bearing in order to facilitate enhanced recovery.

References

Bibliography 
  (ISBN for the Americas 1-58890-159-9.)

External links
 
 

Bones of the lower limb
Femur